Screamin' is an album by organist Jack McDuff recorded in 1962 and released on the Prestige label.

Reception
Allmusic awarded the album four stars calling it, "a spirited blues-oriented set".

Track listing 
All compositions by Jack McDuff except where noted
 "He's a Real Gone Guy" (Nellie Lutcher) - 6:04  
 "Soulful Drums" (Jack McDuff, Joe Dukes) - 4:16  
 "After Hours" (Avery Parrish) - 4:31  
 "Screamin'" - 7:23  
 "I Cover the Waterfront" (Johnny Green, Edward Heyman) - 3:13  
 "One O'Clock Jump" (Count Basie) - 5:48

Personnel 
Jack McDuff - organ
Leo Wright - alto saxophone
Kenny Burrell - guitar
Joe Dukes - drums

References 

Jack McDuff albums
1962 albums
Prestige Records albums
Albums recorded at Van Gelder Studio
Albums produced by Ozzie Cadena